The Ultimate Collection is the fifth compilation album by Rebecca St. James. It was released by ForeFront Records on March 11, 2008. This album is a 2-CD collection of 25 of her most popular songs.

Critical reception

Jared Johnson begins his AllMusic review by saying, "Ultimate in every conceivable meaning of the word, this double-disc collection is generous in length and prolific in its impact."

Laura Sproull of Jesus Freak Hideout gives the album 3½ out of a possible 5 stars and writes, "Both of these discs demonstrate the stages of Rebecca's musical talent and vocal ability and how she has matured since the start of her journey as a young teen. The overall quality of this project is good, but may not be good enough for the dedicated fans who already own the majority of Rebecca's music. There are a few rare gems that make it into this mix, however, including "Lion" from the Narnia soundtrack"

Tony Cummings of Cross Rhythms gives the album an 8 out of a possible 10 and writes, "Rebecca's voice stands out in quality above others and it verges on spectacular. The album shows her as an inventive crafter of music and lyrics and provides some excellent arrangements of other artists' songs."

Michael Dalton of The Phantom Toolbooth gives the album 4 out of a possible 5 and writes, "Rebecca St. James has the heart of a disciple. It's reflected in God-centered lyrics and modern music with an edge. It's this combination of passion for God and artistic integrity that make her a continual favorite with fans. This 2-CD set provides a comprehensive collection of her best material."

Track listing

Production

Mastered by Vinnie Alibrandi
Creative Design by Jan Cook
Design by Andy Norris Design

Track information and credits verified from the album's liner notes.

References

2008 compilation albums
Rebecca St. James albums
ForeFront Records compilation albums